Francisco Javier Camacho Gómez (born 27 October 1964) is a Mexican boxer. He competed in the men's featherweight event at the 1984 Summer Olympics.

A native of Monterrey, he is the son of a boxing judge, also named Javier Camacho.

References

External links
 
 

1964 births
Living people
Mexican male boxers
Olympic boxers of Mexico
Boxers at the 1984 Summer Olympics
Place of birth missing (living people)
Featherweight boxers
Boxers from Nuevo León
Sportspeople from Monterrey